The  is a museum in Tsukuba, Ibaraki, Japan that is dedicated to mapping and surveying.

The museum was the first of its kind in Japan when it was opened by the Geographical Survey Institute of Japan in June 1996.

External links
Official website
Official website 

Tsukuba, Ibaraki
Science museums in Japan
Museums in Ibaraki Prefecture
Cartography organizations
Museums established in 1996
1996 establishments in Japan
Surveying organizations